MTSS may refer to:

Organisations
 Ministerio de Trabajo y Seguridad Social, the Uruguayan ministry of labour and social security
 Ministry of Labour, Solidarity and Social Security (Ministério do Trabalho, Solidariedade e Segurança Social)
 Military Training and Survival School, of the Irish Air Corps
 Stock symbol of MTS (network provider) at the Moscow Exchange

Other uses
 Medial tibial stress syndrome, known also as tibial periostitis or shin splints, a common injury affecting athletes  
 Manuscript tracking systems (MTSs); See iThenticate
 Multiteam system (MTSs)
 Multi-Tiered Systems of Support, in education

See also
 MTSS1 (Metastasis suppressor protein 1), a protein
 MTS (disambiguation)